Wenguan Johnny Huang (born October 5, 1962) is a Chinese-born Canadian male former table tennis player. From 1991 to 2004 he won several medals in singles, doubles, and team events in the North American Table Tennis Championships. He won a bronze medal in the Table Tennis World Cup in 1993. After his retirement from sport in 2005, he went into various lines of business, including marketing, real estate development, and asset management. In 2016 he became co-chairman and executive director of Jete Power Holdings, a Chinese metalworking company.

References

1962 births
Living people
Canadian male table tennis players
Olympic table tennis players of Canada
Table tennis players at the 1996 Summer Olympics
Table tennis players at the 2000 Summer Olympics
Table tennis players at the 2004 Summer Olympics
Commonwealth Games medallists in table tennis
Commonwealth Games silver medallists for Canada
Table tennis players from Guangdong
Naturalised table tennis players
Table tennis players at the 2002 Commonwealth Games
Medallists at the 2002 Commonwealth Games